Bicutan station is a railway station located on the South Main Line in Parañaque, Metro Manila, Philippines.

The station is the fourteenth station southbound from Tutuban and is the only PNR station in Parañaque.

Nearby landmarks
The station is near major landmarks such as the Bicutan Public Market, the headquarters of the Department of Science and Technology, offices of the Philippine National Construction Corporation (PNCC), SM City Bicutan, and Azure Urban Resport Residences. Further away from the station are the Polytechnic University of the Philippines-Taguig, Taguig City University, Camp Bagong Diwa, Walter Mart Bicutan, and the Upper Bicutan National High School.

Transportation links
Bicutan station is accessible by jeepneys plying the Lower Bicutan and East Service Road routes, as well as buses plying the South Luzon Expressway route which stops at Bicutan Interchange. A bus stop is located just outside the station for buses entering the South Luzon Expressway. A pedestrian footbridge also connects to two terminals for tricycles, each going for nearby barangays of Parañaque to the west and Taguig to the east.

It will also be one of the two future interchange stations with the Metro Manila Subway along with FTI station by 2025.

References

Philippine National Railways stations
Railway stations in Metro Manila
Railway stations opened in 1977
Buildings and structures in Parañaque